An extremely rare wintertime tornado outbreak affected the Midwestern United States on January 24, 1967. Of the 30 confirmed tornadoes, 13 occurred in Iowa, nine in Missouri, seven in Illinois, and one in Wisconsin. The outbreak produced, at the time, the northernmost tornado to hit the United States in winter, in Wisconsin, until January 7, 2008. The tornadoes formed ahead of a deep storm system . The deadliest and most damaging tornado of the outbreak struck Greater St. Louis at F4 intensity, killing three people and injuring 216.

Background

On Tuesday, January 24, 1967, a negatively tilted trough bisected the Midwestern United States. As a cold front traversed the Upper Midwest, a line of intermittent, tornado-producing supercells developed.

Impact

Confirmed tornadoes

Along with the 30 confirmed tornadoes listed, tornado researcher Thomas P. Grazulis listed two additional F2 tornadoes that may have touched down.
The first occurred west of Muscatine, Muscatine County, Iowa, at 22:30 UTC, unroofing and tearing apart a house. It was officially listed as a severe thunderstorm wind in Storm Data.
The other occurred on the southern outskirts of Illinois City, Rock Island County, Illinois, at an unknown time, damaging homes before ripping the roof off a farmhouse. It was officially listed as part of a complex of severe thunderstorm winds in Storm Data.

Northern Chesterfield–Maryland Heights–St. Ann–Lambert Field–Spanish Lake, Missouri

Tornado moved through the St. Louis suburbs striking Maryland Heights, St.Ann, Lambert Field, and Spanish Lake. 168 homes were destroyed and 1740 others were damaged. Some of the homes were leveled. A nursing home was also badly damaged.

Non-tornadic effects

Aftermath and recovery

See also
List of tornadoes and tornado outbreaks
List of North American tornadoes and tornado outbreaks
List of tornado-related deaths at schools
Tornado outbreak of January 2008 – Similar rare tornado outbreak in January in the Midwest

Notes

References

Sources

External links
YouTube vido showing damage

St. Louis Tornado Outbreak
F4 tornadoes by date
St. Louis,1967-01-24
History of St. Louis County, Missouri
Tornadoes in Illinois
Tornadoes in Iowa
Tornadoes in Missouri
Tornadoes in Oklahoma
Tornadoes in Wisconsin
St. Louis Tornado Outbreak
St. Louis Tornado Outbreak